Baseball at the 1967 Pan American Games was contested between teams representing Canada, Cuba, Mexico, Puerto Rico, and the United States. The 1967 edition was the fifth Pan American Games, and was hosted by Winnipeg.

Game results
The competition consisted of an initial round-robin phase, with each team facing every other team twice. Thus, each team played eight games in the round-robin phase. The top two teams then met in a best-of-three series to determine the champion.

Round-robin phase

 Later ruled a forfeit win for Puerto Rico due to the Canadian team using former professional baseball players.

 This was the first international loss for Cuba in 12 years.

Championship series
Format: best of three

Medal summary

Medal table

Medalists

Sources

References

1967
1967 Pan American Games
1967
Pan American Games
Baseball in Manitoba